BOC is the abbreviation of:

 Battle of Chancellorsville, during the American Civil War
 Biology of the Cell, an academic journal in biology
 Blackbird Owners Club, Motorclub for people who own a Honda CBR1100XX Super Blackbird and/or Honda X-11
 Bloque Obrero y Campesino, (Spanish: "Workers and Peasants' Bloc"), a former leftwing group in Spain, associated with the international Right Opposition, extant from 1931 to 1935
 BOC (gene), human gene
 BOC Challenge, now renamed the Velux 5 Oceans Race, a round-the-world single-handed sailing yacht race named after its then main sponsor BOC
 Body of Christ, a term in Christian theology with two separate connotations
 Bottom of container, a parachute deployment system.
 British Overseas citizen, one kind of British nationality
 tert-Butoxycarbonyl, abbreviated as "Boc", "BOC" or "t-Boc", a protecting group used in organic chemistry

Banks:

 Bank of Canada, Canada's central bank
 Bank of Ceylon, a major government-owned commercial bank in Sri Lanka
 Bank of China, a major state-owned bank in the People's Republic of China
 Bank of Cyprus, a major Cypriot financial institution

Companies:

 Bell Operating Company, any one of the 24 local telephone companies that AT&T either owned or had a stake in prior to January 1, 1984
 Board of Certification, Inc., a corporation that issues certifications for entry-level Athletic Trainers
 BOC (company), British based industrial gas company, known as Brin's Oxygen Company prior to 1906, and the British Oxygen Company prior to 1975

Film:

 Bride of Chucky

Music:

 Baltimore Opera Company, an opera company in Baltimore, Maryland, United States
 Blue Öyster Cult, an American psychedelic/heavy metal band
 Boards of Canada, a Scottish electronic music duo
 Boston Opera Company, an opera company in Boston, Massachusetts
 Bump of Chicken, a Japanese rock band

Names:

 Emil Boc, Romanian politician

Organizations:

 Baystate Organic Certifiers, which is an organic-certifying agent owned by Massachusetts Independent Certification, Inc. (MICI) and accredited by National Organic Program (NOP)
 Bird Observation & Conservation Australia, an Australian birding association
 British Ornithologists' Club, aims to promote discussion between members and others interested in ornithology, and to facilitate the dissemination of scientific information concerned with ornithology
 British Orthodox Church, an autonomous Oriental Orthodox Church under the Coptic Orthodox Patriarchate of Alexandria
 Bulgarian Olympic Committee, the National Olympic Committee of Bulgaria, part of the International Olympic Committee
 Bulgarian Orthodox Church, an autocephalous Eastern Orthodox Church with adherents in the Republic of Bulgaria and worldwide
 Bureau of Customs, a Philippine government agency under the Department of Finance

Places:

 Bay of Campeche, a bay in southwestern Gulf of Mexico
 Boca Raton, Florida
 Boca Raton station (Brightline)

Technology:

 Binary offset carrier modulation - a digital modulation employed in Galileo and modernized GPS systems

Television:

 Beyond Our Control, an American television series